Núi Sập is a township and capital of Thoại Sơn District in An Giang Province, Vietnam.

References

Communes of An Giang province
Populated places in An Giang province
District capitals in Vietnam
Townships in Vietnam